Stewart Williamson (born 10 December 1961) is a former Scottish professional footballer who played as a defender for Cowdenbeath, Meadowbank Thistle and Livingston.

Club career
Williamson played for Cowdenbeath, Meadowbank Thistle and then Livingston after the team relocated in 1995, making 300 Scottish Football League appearances for the two 'entities' combined. He spent the latter part of his career combining player and assistant manager roles in the Junior leagues with Glenrothes and Tayport.

References

1961 births
Living people
Scottish footballers
Scottish Football League players
Association football defenders
Livingston F.C. players
Cowdenbeath F.C. players
Scottish Junior Football Association players
Footballers from West Lothian
Musselburgh Athletic F.C. players
Oakley United F.C. players